List of Big Ten Conference football standings may refer to:

 List of Big Ten Conference football standings (1896–1958)
 List of Big Ten Conference football standings (1959–present)